Stelis wagneri is a species of orchid plant native to Panama.

References 

wagneri
Flora of Panama